Murali may refer to:

People

Mononyms 
Murali (Malayalam actor) (1954–2009), popular name of Malayalam and Tamil film actor Muraleedharan Pillai, who appeared in Neythukaran and Aadhavan
Murali (Tamil actor) (1964–2010), Tamil actor who appeared in films such as Pagal Nilavu and Vetri Kodi Kattu
Sriimurali, Kannada actor previously credited as Murali
Karthik (actor) (1960–), Tamil actor who is credited in Telugu as Murali

Given name 
Murali Chemuturi (born 1950), Indian software development expert
Murali Coryell (born 1969), American blues guitarist and singer
Murali Gopy (born 1972), Indian screenwriter, actor, author, singer, and journalist
Murali Kartik (born 1976), Indian cricketer
Murali Krishna (director), Indian film director
Murali Kumar Gavit (born 1997), Indian long-distance runner
Murali Kuttan (1953–2010), Indian track and field athlete
Murali Mohan (born 1940),  Indian film actor, producer, politician and business executive
Murali Nair (born 1966), Indian director and screenwriter
Murali Perunelly (born 1950), politician
Murali Pillai (born 1967), Singaporean politician
Murali Sastry (born 1959), Indian scientist
Murali Sharma, Indian character actor
Murali K. Thalluri (born 1984), Australian film director, writer, and producer
Murali Vijay (born 1984), Indian cricketer

Surname 
Anil Murali, Indian film actor
B. Murali (born 1971), Malayalam author
Bala Murali (born 1969), Indian cricket umpire
Chithrakaran Murali, artist from Kerala
D. K. Murali, politician
Kadambari Murali (born 1975), sports journalist
Karthikeyan Murali (born 1999), Indian chess player
Kaviyoor Murali (1931–2001), dalit activist and researcher
Khushi Murali (1963–2013), Indian playback singer
Mithun Murali (born 1992), Indian actor
Mrudula Murali (born 1990), Indian film actress, model, anchor, and classical dancer
Muttiah Muralitharan (born 1972), often referred to as "Murali", Sri Lankan cricketer
N. Murali (born 1946), publisher of the Hindu Group
Posani Krishna Murali (born 1958), Indian screenwriter, actor, director, and producer
Ramisetti Murali (born 1963), Indian social worker and activist
Sabesh–Murali, Indian musical duo
Suchitra Murali, Indian actress
U. K. Murali, Indian singer and music composer

Places
Murali, Arsky District, Republic of Tatarstan
Murali, Kaybitsky District, Republic of Tatarstan

Other
Murali, another name for Bansuri, the flute played by Lord Krishna
Murali, another name for the matrimony vine, Lycium barbarum